Kalikot District, a part of Karnali province, is one of the seventy-seven districts of Nepal. In September 2005, in a bid to encourage a change in social attitudes, the government announced that it would provide rice to any family that had recently had a girl born.

Geography and Climate

Demographics
At the time of the 2011 Nepal census, Kalikot District had a population of 136,948. Of these, 99.5% spoke Nepali, 0.3% Magar and 0.1% other languages as their first language.

In terms of ethnicity/caste, 28.8% were Chhetri, 25.1% Thakuri, 17.7% Kami, 17.1% Hill Brahmin, 5.1% Damai/Dholi, 3.2% Sarki, 1.0% Sanyasi/Dasnami, 0.5% Kumal, 0.5% Lohar, 0.4% Magar, 0.1% Badi, 0.1% other Dalit, 0.1% Teli and 0.2% others.

In terms of religion, 99.8% were Hindu, 0.1% Buddhist and 0.1% Christian.

In terms of literacy, 56.7% could read and write, 4.5% could only read and 38.7% could neither read nor write.

Administration
The district consists of nine municipalities, out of which four are urban municipalities and five are rural municipalities. These are as follows:
 Khandachakra Municipality
 Raskot Municipality
 Tilagufa Municipality
 Pachaljharana Rural Municipality
 Sanni Triveni Rural Municipality
 Narharinath Rural Municipality
 Shubha Kalika Rural Municipality
 Mahawai Rural Municipality
 Palata Rural Municipality

Former Village Development Committees 
Prior to the restructuring of the district, Kalikot District consisted of the following municipalities and Village development committees:

Badalkot
Bharta
Chhapre
Chilkhaya
Daha
Dholagohe
Gela
Jubitha
Khin
Kotbada
Kumalgaun
Lalu
Malkot
Manma
Mehalmudi
Mugraha
Mumra
Nanikot
Odanaku
Pakha
Phoi Mahadev
Phukot
Ranku
Ramnakot
Ranchuli
Rupsa
Sipkhana
Sukitaya
Syuna
Thirpu

See also
Zones of Nepal
Paudhur
List of natural monuments in Kalikot

References

External links
UN map of VDC boundaries, water features and roads in Kalikot
 

 
Districts of Nepal established in 1962
Districts of Karnali Province